Storen may refer to:

Støren, administrative centre of Midtre Gauldal municipality in Trøndelag county, Norway
Støren (municipality),  former municipality in the old Sør-Trøndelag county, Norway
Storen or Store Skagastølstind, third-highest peak in Norway
Storen (surname)